Rai Hau-min (born 2 January 1939) in Tō'oku Village, Shinchiku Prefecture, Japanese Taiwan, was the President of the Judicial Yuan of the Republic of China from 2010 to 2016. An attorney by profession, Rai founded the Formosa Transnational Attorney at Law in 1974, and served as the Chairperson of the Central Election Commission of the Republic of China from 4 November 2009 to 12 October 2010 before his appointment as President of the Judicial Yuan.

Education
Rai obtained his bachelor's and master's degrees in law from National Taiwan University and University of Tokyo in Japan, respectively.

Honors
 Grand Cordon of the Order of the Rising Sun, 2017

See also
 Politics of Taiwan

References

External links

The Honorable Chief Justice & President of Judicial Yuan

1939 births
Living people
National Taiwan University alumni
Taiwanese Presidents of the Judicial Yuan
Taiwanese politicians of Hakka descent
Politicians of the Republic of China on Taiwan from Miaoli County